Mahamudra is a Trance/electronic project based in the south of Israel. Members are Ran Malka (1979), Eyal Cohen (1977) and Sagiv Ben Giat (1982). They have released several tracks on different compilations and their debut album Reality Is Just a Myth released on 20 February 2007 via Utopia Records.

Discography
 Reality Is Just a Myth - 2007
 Break To Beat - 2008
 Simplicity To Complicity - 2009

About the album
Mahamudra's debut album Reality Is Just a Myth presents three perceptions of electronic music that is combined into one harmonic piece. Inspired by everything from Rock, Classical, jazz, 1980s pop, non-western and oriental to electronic music, all tracks were produced with strictness and organized respectively in the album plot. Each and every track was made individually yet formed nicely to the story of the album.

External links
Utopia-Records
Mahamudra's myspace
Album Samples

Israeli psychedelic trance musicians
Remixers